Castle of Dreams (Persian: قصر شیرین) is a 2019 Iranian drama film directed by Reza Mirkarimi and written by Mohammad Davoudi and Mohsen Gharaie. The film screened for the first time at the 37th Fajr Film Festival and was released on July 24, 2019, in Iran theatrically.

Cast 

 Hamed Behdad as Jalal
 Zhila Shahi as Najmeh
 Niousha Alipour as Sara
 Yuna Tadayyon as Ali
 Azadeh Nobahari as Nasrin
 Akbar Aein as Behrouz
 Mohammad Ashkanfar as Flower Seller
 Zoheyr Yari as Shirin's brother
 Mohammad Asgari as Car Buyer
 Babak Lotfi Khajepasha as Police Officer
 Mohammad Asgari as Fotoohi
 Emre Tetikel as Mohammed

Reception

Awards and nominations

References

External links 

 

2010s Persian-language films
2019 drama films
Films directed by Reza Mirkarimi
Iranian drama films